Glycosyltransferase DesVII (DesVII) is an enzyme with systematic name dTDP-3-dimethylamino-3,4,6-trideoxy-alpha-D-glucopyranose:10-deoxymethynolide 3-dimethylamino-4,6-dideoxy-alpha-D-glucosyltransferase. This enzyme catalyses the following chemical reaction

 dTDP-3-dimethylamino-3,4,6-trideoxy-alpha-D-glucopyranose + 10-deoxymethynolide  dTDP + 10-deoxymethymycin

DesVII is the glycosyltransferase responsible for the attachment of TDP-D-desosamine to macrolactones of varied ring sizes.

References

External links 

EC 2.4.1